Myrmecia erecta is an Australian bull ant species apart of the genus Myrmecia. They are native to Australia. They are mainly distributed in South Australia and the surrounding areas of the state.

Most of the body of the species is a brown colour. However, the mandibles, legs and antennae are of a lighter shade of brown. The thorax of the Myrmecia erecta is a black colour. They are slightly similar to the Jack jumper ant.

References

Myrmeciinae
Hymenoptera of Australia
Insects described in 1991
Insects of Australia